The 1932 Australian Grand Prix was a motor race held at the Phillip Island circuit in Victoria, Australia on 14 March 1932. It was the fifth Australian Grand Prix and the fifth to be held at Phillip Island.

The race was organized by the Light Car Club of Australia, formerly known as the Victorian Light Car Club, and was limited to cars having an engine with a piston displacement of 2000cc or less. It was the first Australian Grand Prix to be decided on a straight handicap basis, with the winner being the first car to complete the 31 laps. The two "scratch" competitors had to concede starts ranging up to 29 minutes, equating to an advantage of four laps. The previous practice of cars contesting four classes was discontinued. Weather conditions were reported to be "ideal".

The race, in which there were 18 starters, was won by Bill Thompson driving a Bugatti. Thompson was also awarded the Herald Trophy for recording the fastest time of the race.

Classification 

(#) Sidebottom's Singer was excluded at scrutineering.

(##) The Austin 12 of Compton Jones was withdrawn after its engine suffered a piston failure during practice.

Notes 
 Race distance: 31 laps, 206 miles, 321.8 km
 Race time limit: Four and a quarter hours
 Fastest time: Bill Thompson – 2h 40m 11s (76.27 mph)
 Fastest lap: Bill Thompson – 4m 49.4s (82 mph)

References

External links
 Australian Grand Prix, Camperdown Chronicle, Tuesday 23 February 1932, as archived at trove.nla.gov.au
 Bill Thompson Takes His Second Grand Prix in Record Time,  The Referee, Wednesday 16 March 1932, Page 23, as archived at trove.nla.gov.au
  Motor-Car Grand Prix, The Argus, Tuesday 15 March 1932 Page 13, as archived at trove.nla.gov.au 
 "Grand Prix Road Race", The Argus, Tuesday 15 March 1932, Page 5, as archived at trove.nla.gov.au
 "Racing Car Crashes", The Argus, Tuesday 15 March 1932, Page 5, as archived at trove.nla.gov.au
 "Bill Northam Gets There in "Red Onzer" (images from the 1932 Australian Grand Prix), www.leski.com.au, as archived at web.archive.org
 Image of cover of Official Programme, Australian Grand Prix, Phillip Island, Monday, March 14, 1932, images.squarespace-cdn.com, as archived at web.archive.org

Grand Prix
Australian Grand Prix
Motorsport at Phillip Island
Australian Grand Prix